Rodolfo Ranni (born 31 October 1937 in Trieste, Italy) is an Italian Argentine  film actor.

He has made over 85 film and TV appearances since 1958. More recently he has appeared in Argentine television dramas.
His last job was the Argentinian soap opera Herederos de Una Venganza (Heirs of Revenge).

References

External links
 

1937 births
Argentine male film actors
Living people
Italian emigrants to Argentina
Naturalized citizens of Argentina
Italian expatriates in Argentina

People from Trieste